Rihun is a 2000 Maldivian drama film directed by Hussain Shihab. Produced by Mapa and Gulfam Films, the film stars Ismail Wajeeh, Aishath Shiranee, Fathimath Neena, Hamid Wajeeh and Aminath Rasheedha in pivotal roles.

Premise
Unaiz (Ismail Wajeeh) a successful post graduate, currently working at his mother's office, is sent on an official trip to a nearby island where he starts an affair with Shehenaz (Fathimath Neena). They marry despite Unaiz's workaholic mother (Aminath Rasheedha) dismisses the plan since she believes a marriage is an obstruction to a successful life. Enraged, she tries desperate attempts to separate Shehanz and Unaiz.

Cast 
 Ismail Wajeeh as Unaiz
 Aishath Shiranee as Maana
 Fathimath Neena as Shehenaz
 Hamid Wajeeh as Riza
 Aminath Rasheedha as Saba
 Mohamed Hussain Shihab
 Ahmed Nimal as Athif (Special appearance)
 Fathimath Rameeza as Nisha (Special appearance)

Soundtrack

References

Maldivian drama films
2000 films
2000 drama films
Dhivehi-language films